Evangelical People's Party may refer to:

 Evangelical People's Party (Netherlands), a defunct political party in the Netherlands
 Evangelical People's Party of Switzerland, a current political party in Switzerland